Hastings was an electoral district of the Legislative Assembly in the Australian state of New South Wales from 1859 to 1880. It was abolished in 1880 as part of the first major redistribution since 1858, replaced by Hastings and Manning from 1880 to 1894, which elected two members with voters casting two votes and the two leading candidates being elected. In 1894 it was divided between the single-member electoral district of Hastings and Macleay and Manning. In 1920 proportional representation was introduced and Hastings and Macleay was absorbed into the new four-member district of Oxley. The electorate was named after the Hastings, the alluvial valleys of which contained most of its population.

Members for Hastings

Election results

References

Former electoral districts of New South Wales
1859 establishments in Australia
1880 disestablishments in Australia
Constituencies established in 1859
Constituencies disestablished in 1880